Harry F. Barnes (May 14, 1932 – February 27, 2019) was a United States district judge of the United States District Court for the Western District of Arkansas.

Education and career

Born in Memphis, Tennessee, Barnes received a Bachelor of Science degree from United States Naval Academy in 1956 and was in the United States Marine Corps from 1956 to 1961. He received a Bachelor of Laws from the University of Arkansas School of Law in 1964, entering private practice in Camden, Arkansas from 1964 to 1982, initially as the law partner of future United States Representative, Arkansas Governor and United States Senator David Pryor. He was also in the Marine Corps Reserve from 1964 to 1986. He was a municipal judge for Camden and Ouachita County from 1975 to 1982, and a Circuit judge, Thirteenth Judicial District, State of Arkansas from 1982 to 1993.

Federal judicial service

On October 27, 1993, Barnes was nominated by President Bill Clinton to a seat on the United States District Court for the Western District of Arkansas vacated by Judge Morris S. Arnold, whom President George W. Bush had elevated to the Eighth Circuit Court of Appeals. Barnes was confirmed by the United States Senate on November 20, 1993, and received his commission on November 22, 1993. He assumed senior status on November 1, 2008. He died on February 27, 2019, in Camden.

References

Sources

1932 births
2019 deaths
Arkansas state court judges
Judges of the United States District Court for the Western District of Arkansas
People from Memphis, Tennessee
United States district court judges appointed by Bill Clinton
University of Arkansas School of Law alumni
United States Marine Corps officers
United States Naval Academy alumni
20th-century American judges
21st-century American judges